Frontier Mall is an enclosed shopping mall located in Cheyenne, Wyoming. The  mall opened March 18, 1981. Managed by CBL & Associates Properties of Chattanooga, Tennessee, it is Wyoming's second biggest mall, boasting 67 shops, including five anchor stores: two Dillard's locations, JCPenney, Planet Fitness and JAX outdoor gear. Classic Frontier 9, a theater formerly operated by Carmike Cinemas and now operated by AMC Theatres, is also anchored in the rear of the mall. CBL renovated the mall in 2007, adding three restaurants on the periphery. All anchors are on one level.

Current Anchors
 JCPenney (original anchor)
 Planet Fitness (opened 2017)
 JAX Outdoor Gear (opened 2019)
Dillard’s East (opened 1997, housed the women's department, converted into a full-line Dillard's in 2020)

Former Anchors
Joslins (original anchor, became Dillard’s West in 1998)
Sears (original anchor, closed January 2018, now JAX)
Sports Authority (closed August 2016, now Planet Fitness)
Dillard’s West (former J-Joslins, housed the men's, kids and home furnishings departments. Converted to a clearance center by mid 2020 before closing in November 2020)

References

Shopping malls in Wyoming
Shopping malls established in 1981
CBL Properties
Buildings and structures in Cheyenne, Wyoming
Tourist attractions in Cheyenne, Wyoming
1981 establishments in Wyoming